Doda Conrad (19 February 1905 – 28 December 1997) was a Polish-born American bass operatic singer.

Career 
The son of Marya Freund, Conrad studied singing with Emilio de Gogorza in New York, then made his debut in Paris in 1932 at the École normale de musique de Paris and the Théâtre de la Porte-Saint-Martin. In 1936 he worked with Nadia Boulanger. He performed French songs, and lieder by Chopin and Schubert. He commissioned mouvement du cœur on poems by Louise de Vilmorin on music composed by Henri Sauguet, Jean Françaix, Francis Poulenc, Darius Milhaud, and visions infernales written by Henri Sauguet. In 1965 he no longer appeared on stage and was involved in music promotion. He founded he Erémurus company, the Saison musicale of the Abbaye de Royaumont and directed the journées musicales of Langeais. When he was young, he destined himself to painting on the advice of Picasso and later became a close friend of Stravinsky and Saint-John Perse.

Sources

External links 
 Mort du chanteur Doda Conrad on Libération (30 December 1997) 
 Doda Conrad on Encyclopédie Larousse 
 " Doda " Conrad, un Blésois à la fois célèbre et méconnu on La Nouvelle République (5 May 2012) 
 Biography on Bach-cantatas.com
 Doda Conrad, basse - interview French, 17/12/1997. part 1 on YouTube 

1905 births
People from the Province of Silesia
1997 deaths
American operatic basses
American people of Polish-Jewish descent
20th-century American male opera singers
Polish emigrants to the United States